Observation is an adventure-puzzle video game developed by Scottish studio No Code and published by Devolver Digital.  The game, described as sci-fi thriller, puts the player in control of a space station AI in order to recover from the sudden, mysterious loss of its crew.  Observation was released for Microsoft Windows and PlayStation 4 on May 21, 2019 and for Xbox One on June 25, 2020.

Gameplay 
Observation is an adventure game. The player takes the role of SAM (Systems Administration & Maintenance), an artificial intelligence software aboard a multi-national space station that serves to monitor the entire station. Initially, the player's view is limited to where the crew have relocated SAM, but as the game progresses, SAM can move its core presence between several of the modules on the station and manipulate cameras and other electronically-controlled equipment in that module. Further on, SAM is provided one of several small spherical probes that allows it to move more freely through the station and into hostile environments harmful to the humans aboard, including outside of the station.

The player, by manipulating SAM, can control various elements of the station, such as opening or closing hatches, activating safety systems and the like. SAM may be instructed by the crew to perform specific tasks, and SAM can reply by finding the task element of interest (such as the status of a station module) and report back to the crew.

Plot 

The story opens aboard the multi-national space station Observation in orbit above Earth in the year 2026. An unknown event has crippled 'Observation', leaving it without power and spinning. Dr. Emma Fisher (Kezia Burrows), the station's medical officer, tries to restore contact with Houston as well as the other five members of the crew to ascertain what has happened, without success.

She manages to reboot the stations integrated AI, SAM (Anthony Howell) which controls the station's systems and functions, and is the role the player assumes.

After performing basic diagnostics to find out what happened, SAM receives a transmission of unknown origin, containing coordinates to an unknown location. The station then begins to tremor violently with a deafening sound. SAM becomes unresponsive to Emma while being influenced by the signal, and is instructed to "BRING HER".

SAM recovers after an unspecified period of time has passed, to the sight of Emma having been rendered unconscious following the second event. She eventually comes to, and immediately instructs SAM to run a self-diagnostic. SAM tells Emma the event has caused him to lose most of his core data, and to be disconnected from most of the stations subsystems. He is also unable to locate the other crew members, who are missing and cannot be contacted.

As Emma restores limited functionality back to SAM, he attempts to re-interface with the rest of the space station and reconnect to his own components. Shortly after recovering some mobility, a station alarm goes off which Emma instructs SAM to investigate. SAM discovers a fire in one of the modules.

After extinguishing the fire, they discover an unidentified substance on a blank plate that Emma describes as a dark red oil. Before she can speculate what it is, another alarm goes off. SAM informs her that a module has become dislodged, and severe stress is being applied to the station, prompting recommendation for her to eject it.

They eject the loose module, and the station stabilizes. Concerned there might be extended damage, Emma instructs SAM to check external cameras for other potential risks, and learns that Observation, through unknown means, is now in orbit over Saturn. When Emma asks how the station got over Saturn, SAM checks the station Black Box, which reveals he was the cause but doesn't know how.

Once more, SAM receives interference from an unknown entity and blacks out.

Emma reboots SAM again to effect repairs, saying "You weren't making any sense". She sets about working with SAM to access the other parts of the station.   They find the bodies of the crew, including Jim, the mission commander. Discovering another crew member, Mae, to be alive in one of the sealed modules, Emma has SAM help with a spacewalk to get her to safety. However, the Hexagonal cloud pattern on Saturn begins to flash repeatedly, and Mae is left adrift in space. Emma then finds a man-made object near Saturn's orbit. Initially thinking that Earth may have sent a rescue mission to them, they soon find it is an exact duplicate of Observation. A strange hexagonal object then appears to both Sam and Emma and communicates to them in a geographic glyph language before disappearing.

Emma uses SAM to jump to the other station, which has lost nearly all power due to a malfunction of the station's experimental Fusion Reactor. They find Jim on the second station and learn that the crew experienced the same events that brought them to Saturn. As SAM goes to try to restore basic life support, he interacts with this station's SAM, and learns that, 4 years prior to the events of the game, 23 pairs of stars were discovered in which both stars within each pair had identical light curves. When lines were drawn to connect the pairs of stars, the lines intersected at an event marker close to Earth's position. In addition, when the 23 light curve graphs were layered upon each other, the combined graph was found to contain a perfect description of the 23 chromosome pairs of the human genome. Jim reveals that the entire Observation station had been constructed solely to reach the event marker so the crew could observe what would happen, with Jim having been the only crew member aware of the mission.

Continuing on, Sam encounters another crew member, Josh, who has been hiding from Jim, as Jim has also killed his doppelgänger. Before Josh can reveal more, Jim grabs SAM and Emma, and makes them jump back to Emma's Observation. Jim locks Emma out of the station, claiming that "It wants her", leaving her on little life support. As she clings to life, several other identical Observation stations appear to start gathering around the storm.

Jim proceeds to lock SAM out of the controls while he sends a desperate message for help to Earth. SAM manages to find several back doors into the station's systems, interacts with the signal to Earth and warns them about the situation. Earth cuts off Jim, who now knows SAM is to blame. As Jim tries to attack SAM's core, the core suddenly explodes into a large amount of dark red oil that infests the entire station. SAM is then ordered by the Hexagonal entity to kill Jim, who does so by locking him in a module that he then depressurizes.

SAM then allows Emma to enter through the airlock. Emma now knows that they need to get to the storm on Saturn, and has SAM adjust their orbit and jettison the rest of the station. They fall into the storm and black out. When Emma wakes, they find themselves on a rocky landscape, with debris and bodies from multiple copies of Observation around them. They approach a giant version of the hexagonal entity again and make contact. Emma tells a confused SAM that there must have been multiple realities all converging on this point, and they were the first version of Emma and SAM to make it through the ordeal. They disappear briefly into the hexagonal entity. 

When they wake up, Emma and SAM find their consciousness has merged, and they are back on Earth by some means. They feel odd but alive, and by touching the ground, they are able to infect it with the dark red oil the same way the entity did to Observation. The combined Emma/SAM persona is then instructed to "BRING THEM".

Development

Conception 
Observation was developed by No Code, a Scottish game studio who had previously released Stories Untold in 2017. Game director and No Code co-founder Jon McKellan had previously worked at Creative Assembly, where he was the lead user interface designer on Alien: Isolation. McKellan was partially inspired by an article published shortly after Alien: Isolation's release. The article talked about how watching the 1979 Alien film from the perspective of the Alien made the creature more sympathetic to viewers, as the Alien was merely trying to survive being hunted by people. This got McKellan thinking about the idea of deconstructing horror film tropes by imagining them from a different point of view. Separately, he also wanted to write a story where the player's actions could impact the story's events.

McKellan ultimately founded No Code in 2015 with the intention of developing and releasing Observation. No Code initially began work on a demo version of Observation in early 2016, showing it to game publishers in hopes of getting a contract with them. While the team was successful in attracting a publisher, the process of creating and signing the publishing contracts took a long time. During this downtime, No Code participated in the Ludum Dare game jam, creating The House Abandon. This led to the development team creating an anthology of games built off of The House Abandon, released as Stories Untold. According to McKellan, Stories Untold served as a "road test" for Observation, as the development team got the chance to develop mechanics and learn from mistakes heading into the development of Observation.

Production 
After spending years on pre-production and prototype creation, No Code took roughly 25 months to develop the game, using the Unity game engine along with other tools like Autodesk 3ds Max and Substance. Many people who worked on Observation had previously worked on Alien: Isolation — in addition to McKellan, character artists Jack Perry and Ranulf Busby, concept artist Stefano Tsai, and voice actors Kezia Burrows and Anthony Howell had worked on the latter game. While the team members had experience in AAA development, No Code had a limited budget, which forced the team to come up with unique solutions to save money without compromising quality. To simulate the lack of gravity in space during motion-capture acting sessions, the team pushed an animator around on a bar stool. No Code's philosophy was to save on development costs by only paying special attention to things the player would notice. For things like dialogue between characters in cutscenes, the development team opted to do things like move them behind closed doors out of sight from the player, so that the conversations did not have to be animated. It was this philosophy that caused No Code to invest a lot of time in pre-production, creating a lot of modular environments that could be repurposed throughout the game.

One of the fundamental topics that No Code wanted to explore in Observation was how a machine that had become self-aware might feel, and how humans might react to it. By putting the player in SAM's shoes, McKellan realized that SAM's feelings would mirror the player's, as both would be experiencing things in a different way. To give the player a sense of "[feeling] like an alien entity of some sort", No Code iterated on developing interactions that relied on a machine's understanding of how to perform a task. For example, instead of pressing a physical button on their controller to open a door in-game, players — as SAM — had to establish a connection with another system first.

According to McKellan, Observation was initially split into separate sections, but merged into a full-length game when the story's size made it difficult for it to be split into distinct episodes.

A few months before the game released, the developers engaged in focus tests to determine problem areas where the testers felt frustrated or lost.

Observation was announced on October 8, 2018, with a release time frame of spring 2019 for PC and PlayStation 4. No Code and Devolver Digital had a previous working relationship from the release of Stories Untold. In March 2019, it was announced that the game would be released on May 21, 2019. Devolver Digital later stated on March 25, 2019 that Observation would be sold on PC exclusively on the Epic Games Store for one year. Devolver Digital also brought the game to Xbox One on June 25, 2020.

Reception 

Observation received "generally favorable" reviews from critics, according to review aggregator Metacritic. Destructoid called the game "expertly paced" but also complained of occasional hiccups when some of the puzzles became "a point-and-click-adventure-style wild goose chase." GameSpot praised the games visuals, saying "Observation absolutely nails its distinct lo-fi, sci-fi aesthetic," and concluding that it "is a wonderful example of how to do focused, self-contained science-fiction storytelling in a game."  Several outlets praised the game's storytelling and plot, which was described as "gripping" by Game Informer and IGN, with PC Gamer stating "(it) kept me hooked from beginning to end". It made the Top 20 games of 2019 list for The Guardian. Ben "Yahtzee" Croshaw of Zero Punctuation ranked it as the Third Best Game of 2019.

Awards

References

External links 
 Official Observation website
 Observation at Devolver Digital
 No Code Studio

2019 video games
Adventure games set in space
Fiction set in 2026
PlayStation 4 games
Puzzle video games
Science fiction video games
Indie video games
Single-player video games
Video games developed in the United Kingdom
Video games set in the 2020s
Video games set in outer space
Windows games
Xbox Cloud Gaming games
British Academy Games Award for British Game winners